Harrison Summers may refer to:

Harrison Boyd Summers (1894–1980), American pioneer in radio broadcasting, radio historian and educator
Harrison C. Summers (1918–1983), American U.S. Army soldier and DSC recipient

See also
Harry Summers (disambiguation)